Girolamo Farnese (1599–1668) was a Roman Catholic cardinal.

Biography
On 26 Apr 1639, was consecrated bishop by Giovanni Battista Scanaroli, Titular Bishop of Sidon, with Tommaso Carafa, Bishop Emeritus of Vulturara e Montecorvino, and Giovanni Battista Altieri (seniore), Bishop Emeritus of Camerino, serving as co-consecrators.

Episcopal succession
While bishop, he was the principal consecrator of:
Giannicolò Conti, Bishop of Ancona e Numana (1666);
the principal co-consecrator of

References

1599 births
1668 deaths
17th-century Italian cardinals
Cardinals created by Pope Alexander VII
Apostolic Nuncios to Switzerland